Paraona bicolor is a moth of the family Erebidae. It was described by Hervé de Toulgoët in 1968. It is found on Madagascar.

References

Lithosiina
Moths described in 1968